Bruce Baden Collette (born March 13, 1934) is an American ichthyologist.

Biography 
He was born on March 13, 1934, in Brooklyn, New York. He is the son of Raymond Hill Collette and Agnes Hellen (Lavsen) Collette.

Publications
 The diversity of fishes : biology, evolution, and ecology (with Gene S. Helfman and Douglas E. Facey); Malden (Mass.) : Blackwell science, cop. 2009.
 Results of the Tektite Program: ecology of coral reef fishes (with Sylvia Alice Earle); Natural History Museum, Los Angeles County, 1972.

Taxon named in his honor 
The creole darter (Etheostoma collettei) was named in his honour in 1969, 
The toadfish genus Colletteichthys was named in 2006 in his honour too.

Taxon described by him
See :Category:Taxa named by Bruce Baden Collette

References

1934 births
Living people
American ichthyologists
Cornell University alumni